The 1996 Japan Open Tennis Championships included this tournament in women's doubles.  Miho Saeki and Yuka Yoshida were the defending champions but lost in the first round to Sung-Hee Park and Shi-Ting Wang.

Kimiko Date and Ai Sugiyama won in the final 7–6, 6–7, 6–3 against Amy Frazier and Kimberly Po.

Seeds
Champion seeds are indicated in bold text while text in italics indicates the round in which those seeds were eliminated.

 Sabine Appelmans /  Kyoko Nagatsuka (quarterfinals)
 Amy Frazier /  Kimberly Po (final)
 Laurence Courtois /  Nancy Feber (first round)
 Karin Kschwendt /  Rene Simpson (semifinals)

Draw

External links
 1996 Japan Open Tennis Championships Women's Doubles Draw

Doubles